A Short History of Indians in Canada is a collection of short stories by Thomas King, published by HarperCollins in 2005. Although the majority of the stories deal with issues surrounding First Nations people, the topics and styles are quite diverse.

The book won the McNally Robinson Aboriginal Book of the Year Award in 2006.

Stories
A Short History of Indians in Canada
Tidings of Comfort and Joy
The Dog I Wish I had, I Would Call It Helen
The Baby in the Airmail Box
Coyote and the Enemy Aliens
Haida Gwaii
Little Bombs
The Colour of Walls
Bad Men Who Love Jesus
The Closer You Get to Canada, the More Things Will Eat Your Horses
Noah's Ark
Where the Borg Are
States to Avoid
Fire and Rain
Rendezvous
Domestic Furies
The Garden Court Motor Motel
Not Counting the Indian, There Were Six
Another Great Moment in Canadian Indian History

Short story collections by Thomas King (novelist)
2005 short story collections
HarperCollins books